Tivrem is a village in the Ponda taluka (sub-district) of Goa.

Area, population

 India census, Tivrem in Ponda taluka has an area of 210 hectares, a total of 454 households, a population of 1,878 (comprising 960 males and 918 females) with an under-six years population of 156 (comprising 82 boys and 74 girls).

Its location code number as per the 2011 census is 626843.

Location

Tivrem is located in the northern part of Ponda taluka.  It is close to Corlim in Tiswadi taluka.

Tivrem lies approx 15.8 km from the sub-district (taluka) headquarters of Ponda town, and approx 19.6 km away from the district North Goa headquarters of Panaji or Panjim.

Local jurisdiction

Tivrem lies under the Tivrem-Orgaon (Tivre-Orgao) gram panchayat.

References

Villages in North Goa district